Alto Gállego (Aragonese: Alto Galligo) is a comarca located in the north of the autonomous community of Aragón, Spain. It occupies practically the entirety of the upper basin of the Río Gállego.

Historically the comarca was a part of the area known as Jacetania, the original nucleus of the old county of Aragón. The historical territories integrated into that area were the Tena Valley, the lands surrounding Biescas, and the Serrablo.

Today, Alto Gállego borders with the comarca of Jacetania to the West, the Sobrarbe to the East, the Hoya de Huesca,  France to the North.

Territory and Population

See also 

 Linea P

References

External links 
Official Website
Friends of Serrablo 
Official map (pdf)
Comarcas of Aragón, Alto Gállego

Geography of the Province of Huesca
Comarcas of Aragon
Pyrenees